Chloanthes stoechadis is a species of flowering plant in the  family Lamiaceae. It is a small under shrub with wrinkled leaves and yellowish green flowers.

Description
The calyx lobes narrowly oval-shaped, blistered with  margins curved or rolled under. Flowering occurs usually from July to October, followed by dry, hemispherical fruit.

Taxonomy and naming
Chloanthes stoechadis was first formally described in 1810 by Robert Brown and description was published in Prodromus florae Novae Hollandiae et insulae Van-Diemen, exhibens characteres plantarum quas annis 1802-1805. The specific epithet (stoechadis) refers to its similarity to "lavender" leaves.

Distribution and habitat
This species usually grows near rocky outcrops, on poor sandy soils in woodland, sclerophyll forest and heath north of Jervis Bay in New South Wales.  A rare species in Western Australia, also found in scattered locations in Queensland.

References

stoechadis
Flora of New South Wales
Flora of Western Australia
Flora of Queensland
Lamiales of Australia
Plants described in 1810
Taxa named by Robert Brown (botanist, born 1773)